History of the Iranian Constitutional Revolution is a non-fiction book by the Iranian historian Ahmad Kasravi. Cited as the most accurate account of the Persian Constitutional Revolution, it chronicles the event and the ensuing struggle of the revolution that took place between 1905 and 1911 in Persia (known today as Iran).

The book was originally written in 1940 in Persian. In 2006, the first volume of the book was translated to English and published by American scholar Evan Siegel.

Books 
 Ahmad Kasravi, Tarikh-e Mashruteh-ye Iran (تاریخ مشروطهٔ ایران) (History of the Iranian Constitutional Revolution), in Persian, 951 p. (Negāh Publications, Tehran, 2003), . 
Note: This book is also available in two volumes, published by Amir Kabir Publications in 1984. Amir Kabir's 1961 edition is in one volume, 934 pages.
 Ahmad Kasravi, History of the Iranian Constitutional Revolution: Tarikh-e Mashrute-ye Iran, Volume I, translated into English by Evan Siegel, 347 p. (Mazda Publications, Costa Mesa, California, 2006).

See also
The Silk Roads
The Comprehensive History of Iran
Iran Between Two Revolutions
Foucault in Iran: Islamic Revolution after the Enlightenment

References

1940 non-fiction books
Iranian books
Persian Constitutional Revolution
Books about politics of Iran
20th-century history books
History books about Iran
Books about revolutions

Books by Ahmad Kasravi